Ashish Jaiswal  is a Shiv Sena politician from Nagpur district, Maharashtra. He is Member of Legislative Assembly from Ramtek Vidhan Sabha constituency of Nagpur, Maharashtra as independent member. He had been elected for three consecutive terms in the Maharashtra Legislative Assembly for 1999, 2004 and 2009.

Positions held
 1999: Elected to Maharashtra Legislative Assembly (1st term)
 2004: Re-elected to Maharashtra Legislative Assembly (2nd term)
 2009: Re-elected to Maharashtra Legislative Assembly (3rd term)
 2018: Appointed chairman of Maharashtra State Mining Corporation 
 2019: Re-elected to Maharashtra Legislative Assembly (4th term)

See also
 Ramtek Lok Sabha constituency

References

External links
  Shivsena Home Page 

Living people
People from Nagpur district
Maharashtra MLAs 1999–2004
Maharashtra MLAs 2004–2009
Maharashtra MLAs 2009–2014
Marathi politicians
Shiv Sena politicians
Year of birth missing (living people)